Kurt Deutsch is an actor, director, record producer and film producer. He is the Senior Vice President for Theatrical & Catalog Development for Warner/Chappell Music, and President of Sh-K-Boom Records, a division of Warner Arts Music.

Sh-K-Boom/Ghostlight Records
In 2000, Deutsch founded Sh-K-Boom Records, an independent record label that aimed to bridge the gap between pop/rock and theater. In 2004, a new musical theater subsidiary of Sh-K-Boom, Ghostlight Records, was created to focus on more traditional scores and cast recordings. As of 2015, the label has over 150 albums in its catalog, including The Book of Mormon (musical), In the Heights, the Original Cast Recording, Original Motion Picture Soundtrack and New Off-Broadway Cast Recordings of The Last Five Years, Beautiful: The Carole King Musical, A Gentleman's Guide to Love and Murder, Something Rotten!, The Bridges of Madison County (musical), Disney’s Newsies (musical), the 2013 revival of Pippin (musical), Cinderella (2013 Broadway production), Next to Normal, the 2009 revival of Hair (musical), Legally Blonde (musical), Bloody Bloody Andrew Jackson, Everyday Rapture, Passing Strange, Dirty Rotten Scoundrels (musical), The 25th Annual Putnam County Spelling Bee, The Drowsy Chaperone and many more Broadway and Off-Broadway shows.

Sh-K-Boom/Ghostlight Records, under Deutsch's leadership, have produced and released the debut solo albums of Broadway stars such as Adam Pascal, Sherie Rene Scott, Patti LuPone, Sutton Foster, Kelli O'Hara, Alice Ripley, Melissa Errico, Billy Porter, Ben Vereen, Daphne Rubin-Vega, Judy Kuhn, Christine Ebersole, Julia Murney, Ashley Brown, Linda Lavin, Lea Delaria, Anastasia Barzee and Klea Blackhurst.

Under the name Sh-K-Boom Entertainment, Deutsch was the driving force for and a producer of the 2014 film adaptation of Jason Robert Brown's The Last Five Years (film), written and directed by Richard LaGravenese and starring Anna Kendrick and Jeremy Jordan.

As of 2017, Deutsch joined Warner Music Group as a Senior Vice President for Warner/Chappell Publishing, and executive for Warner Arts on the label side.

Awards and honors

As producer, Deutsch received his first Grammy Award for Best Musical Show Album in 2009 for The Original Broadway Cast Album In The Heights along with fellow producers Alex Lacamoire, Andrés Levin, Lin-Manuel Miranda, Joel Moss & Bill Sherman. He has since received two more Grammy Awards for Best Musical Show Album for The Book of Mormon: Original Broadway Cast Recording and Beautiful: The Carole King Musical.

A full list of Grammy Award wins and nominations for Sh-K-Boom/ Ghostlight Records are as follows:

2003
 Great Joy: A Gospel Christmas

2005
 Hair – The Actors’ Fund of America Benefit Recording
 The 25th Annual Putnam County Spelling Bee – Original Broadway Cast Recording
 Dirty Rotten Scoundrels – Original Broadway Cast Recording

2006
 The Drowsy Chaperone – Original Broadway Cast Recording

2008
 (winner) In The Heights – Original Broadway Cast Recording

2009
 Hair – 2009 Broadway Revival Cast Recording

2011
 (winner) The Book of Mormon – Original Broadway Cast Recording
 Anything Goes – 2011 Broadway Cast Recording

2014
 (winner) Beautiful: The Carole King Musical – Original Broadway Cast Recording
 A Gentleman's Guide to Love and Murder – Original Broadway Cast Recording
 Aladdin (musical) – Original Broadway Cast Recording

Sh-K-Boom and Ghostlight were awarded a special 2006 Drama Desk Award for dedication to the preservation of musical theatre through original cast albums.

Acting
As an actor Deutsch appeared on Broadway in Broadway Bound, A Few Good Men and has appeared Off-Broadway and in regional theaters around the country. He was a series regular on the television series The Human Factor and Winnetka Road, and he guest starred on Sex and the City, Law & Order, Quantum Leap, Matlock, and Models Inc. His film roles included The Eye of the Storm, The First To Go, and Labor Pains . Deutsch also had an uncredited cameo appearance alongside wife Sherie Renee Scott in the film version of The Last Five Years in a casting session scene. (Scott originated the role of Cathy, played in the film by Anna Kendrick, in the original 2001 off-Broadway cast.)

References

External links
 
 Sh-K-Boom Records
 Time Out New York article on Deutsch

1966 births
Male actors from St. Louis
American record producers
Syracuse University alumni
Living people